The Gulf Correctional Institution  is a state prison for men located in Wewahitchka, Gulf County, Florida, owned and operated by the Florida Department of Corrections.  With a mix of security levels including minimum, medium, and close, this facility was opened in 1992 and has a maximum capacity of 1568 prisoners.

The Gulf Annex opened in May 1999 at an adjacent property, street address 699 Ike Steele Road.  It holds another 1,398 inmates at the same security levels.

References

Prisons in Florida
Buildings and structures in Gulf County, Florida
1992 establishments in Florida